Baltimore is a town in Windsor County, Vermont, United States. The population was 229 at the 2020 census.

Geography
According to the United States Census Bureau, the town has a total area of 4.7 square miles (12.1 km2), all land.

Demographics

As of the census of 2000, there were 250 people, 92 households, and 74 families residing in the town.  The population density was 53.5 people per square mile (20.7/km2).  There were 105 housing units at an average density of 22.5 per square mile (8.7/km2).  The racial makeup of the town was 98.00% White, 0.40% African American, 0.40% Native American, 0.40% Asian, and 0.80% from two or more races. Hispanic or Latino of any race were 0.40% of the population.

There were 92 households, out of which 34.8% had children under the age of 18 living with them, 68.5% were married couples living together, 7.6% had a female householder with no husband present, and 18.5% were non-families. 7.6% of all households were made up of individuals, and 2.2% had someone living alone who was 65 years of age or older.  The average household size was 2.72 and the average family size was 2.88.

In the town, the population was spread out, with 24.8% under the age of 18, 6.4% from 18 to 24, 32.8% from 25 to 44, 25.6% from 45 to 64, and 10.4% who were 65 years of age or older.  The median age was 37 years. For every 100 females, there were 125.2 males.  For every 100 females age 18 and over, there were 111.2 males.

The median income for a household in the town was $44,375, and the median income for a family was $46,964. Males had a median income of $28,750 versus $21,563 for females. The per capita income for the town was $17,260.  About 2.4% of families and 7.0% of the population were below the poverty line, including 2.9% of those under the age of eighteen and none of those 65 or over.

References

External links 

 
Towns in Vermont
Towns in Windsor County, Vermont